I Choose You is the tenth album and sixth studio album by Contemporary Christian group Point of Grace. It was released in 2004 by Word Records.

The album is the first to feature new member, Leigh Cappillino, who replaced founding member Terry Jones. It is also the group's first full studio album since their 2001 release, Free to Fly.

The title track was written by former According To John front-man John Waller, who went on to write the song "While I'm Waiting" for the 2008 film Fireproof.

Track listing

Singles
 "I Choose You"-#12
 "Who Am I"- #17
 "Waiting In The Wings"-#33
 "Make It Real"-#15

Personnel 
Point of Grace
 Shelley Breen – vocals 
 Heather Payne – vocals 
 Denise Jones – vocals 
 Leigh Cappillino – vocals 

Musicians
 Brent Bourgeois – keyboards, programming 
 Wayne Kirkpatrick – keyboards, acoustic guitar 
 Jimmy Frazier – programming 
 David Zaffiro – programming, acoustic guitar, electric guitar, guitars 
 Tom Bukovac – acoustic guitar, electric guitar 
 Jerry McPherson – guitars 
 Jonathan Yudkin – mandolin, strings
 Pat Malone – bass 
 Matt Pierson – bass 
 Jimmie Lee Sloas – bass
 Ralph Stover – bass
 Steve Brewster – drums 
 Mark Hammond – drums, programming 
 Chris McHugh – drums 
 Bruce Spencer – drums 
 James "J.T." Taylor – tambourine 
 Chance Scoggins – vocal arrangements

Production 
 Mark Hammond – producer (1)
 Wayne Kirkpatrick – producer (2, 4, 6, 7)
 David Zaffiro – producer (3, 5, 8, 9, 10), mixing
 Brent Bourgeois – producer (11, 12), mixing 
 Shawn McSpadden – executive producer 
 Mark Lusk – A&R 
 John Mays – A&R
 Nathan Dantzler – engineer 
 Tony Palacios – engineer 
 Ralph Stover – engineer, mixing 
 Dave Dillbeck – mixing, editing, Pro Tools
 Kenzi Butler – assistant engineer 
 Charles Meserole – guitar engineer 
 David Schober – vocal recording 
 Dan Shike – mastering at Tone and Volume Mastering (Nashville, Tennessee).
 Betty Ashton Andrews – production assistant
 Susan Zaffiro – production assistant
 Chuck Hargett – art direction, design 
 Katherine Petillo – art direction
 Andrew Southam – photography 
 David Kaufman – stylist
 Kali – hair stylist 
 Tracy Sondern – make-up

2004 albums
Point of Grace albums